Lignowy Szlacheckie  is a village in the administrative district of Gmina Pelplin, within Tczew County, Pomeranian Voivodeship, in northern Poland.

The village has a population of 705.

References

Lignowy Szlacheckie